China Plus One, also known simply as Plus One or C+1, is the business strategy to avoid investing only in China and diversify business into other countries, or to channel investmens into manufacturing in other promising developing economies such as the world's most populous country and fastest growing major economy India or Thailand or Vietnam For the last 20 years, western companies have invested mainly in China, drawn in by their low production costs, and enormous domestic consumer markets. Developing from the overconcentration of business interests in China, it may be done for reasons of cost, safety, or long-term stability. It has also been described as a 'macro-level phenomenon'.

Corporate C+1 strategies 
The increasing cost of doing business in China has also increased operating costs, especially for manufacturers. The advantages of the cheap labor and market demand that China initially provided has increasingly been overshadowed by the advantages that ASEAN countries  can provide. These benefits include cost control, as workers in Southeast Asian countries are generally less expensive than Chinese employees, risk diversification, and new market access into economies  There is also a high level of risk for investors in the Chinese transitional economy, the sources of this risk can be credited to social, and political change.

Multinational corporations have been looking at countries with adequately stable governments such as India, Vietnam, Indonesia, Malaysia, Thailand, Philippines and Bangladesh . Countries like Japan and United States are part of the phenomenon, with the strategy conceptualizing in businesses in these countries as early as 2008. However the China Plus One strategy has its own share of difficulties, including navigating new laws, new markets, and streamlining the business over multiple locations. Some say that moving out of China now is not even practical. The China Plus One strategy does give China its own benefits. China is able to maintain low-end manufacturing while also growing higher-value sectors. China Plus One strategy did not reduce the number of manufacturers, nor jobs in manufacturing. It does, however, reduce the number of growth, giving other economies a chance to flourish.

Following the COVID-19 pandemic, numerous Indian companies have adopted strategy to find alternative supply chains. India's largest air conditioner manufacturer Voltas has started production of motors in India to reduce its reliance on China; Indian auto component manufacturers are also building the base to shift out of China, changing reliance to local vendors for some components; the same is the case for pharma companies.

C+1 India Strategy 

India being the World's largest democracy and the most populous country (Surpassing China in January 2023) and having a relatively stable government and the Indian government encouraging a pro business environment has made it to emerge as the biggest beneficiary of the China+1 Strategy with several major Multi National Corporations moving their operations from China and setting up industries and offices in the country.

India has several unique things attached to it like no other such as the Aadhaar Program and Unified Payments Interface, due to which it has achieved many milestones that Superpowers like United States and China haven't been able to achieve.

According to the International Monetary Fund, United Nations and World Bank India is better positioned to navigate global headwinds than other major emerging Economies and India is a true bright spot in the midst of a global downturn with the Indian economy projected to grow at a robust 6.6% in FY24, according to the World Bank despite the world staring at a recession and negative growth of several economies

India has a dedicated highly trained Central Industrial Security Force which provides round the clock security to its major industries and CISF also plays a key role in national security and has been deployed across all the major airports, atomic energy stations, sea ports, space installations, thermal power plants, defence production units, coal fields, important government buildings and Metro systems across the country.

There are several factors which favours India the most in place of other promising economies that of Thailand or Vietnam when shifting out of China one being that India has the world's largest diaspora, which makes Indians adapt to foreign cultures and languages easily, with over 18.5 million Indians living outside the country a number greater than the population of many countries. Since 2005, when Indians formed the world's third largest diaspora at 9.5 million, their numbers have risen by staggering 95%.

Also, India has the Largest English Speaking Work-Force along with the country being home to the 2nd largest English Speaking population only behind the United States and according to several estimates it will overtake the latter within this decade to become the largest English Speaking Country.

India is undertaking several Massive world class ambitious Infrastructure projects across the country to promote Foreign direct investment in India and aiding the Investors with setting up Mega factories and Industries with flagship Multi-billion dollar Mega Projects like Bharatmala and Sagarmala Mega Projects, Eastern Dedicated Freight Corridor and Western Dedicated Freight Corridor, Delhi–Meerut Expressway and Delhi–Meerut Regional Rapid Transit System, North-South Dedicated Freight Corridor, Delhi–Mumbai Expressway, Delhi-Dehradun high-speed rail corridor, Chennai Bangalore Industrial Corridor, Amritsar–Kolkata Industrial Corridor, East Coast Economic Corridor, Mumbai-Bangalore economic corridor, Udhana-Palsana Industrial Corridor, Visakhapatnam–Chennai Industrial Corridor, Visakhapatnam Special Economic Zone, Andhra Pradesh Special Economic Zone, Jawaharlal Nehru Pharma City.

India over the past decade has developed numerous Greenfield Indian Special Economic Zones, Indian Expressways, Indian National Highways to promote investments and build world-class Infrastructure according to International Standards.

Recently the world's most valuable company Apple the manufacturer of IPhone and IPad had setup mega factories in India to manufacture it's products at par with China and the United States, with only Foxconn and Salcomp directly employing 70,000 and 25,000 Skilled Workers respectively as of 2022 with having major expansion plans in the pipeline for the future, the former is also building an in-house Housing Complex to house around 60,000 Workers. Reportedly Apple wants to manufacture around 25% of its entire lineup of iPhones in India During the first three quarters of 2022, Apple exported $2.5 Billion worth of iPhones from India, hinting at a major manufacturing shift towards India.

India has formed a Special Agency named NITI Aayog under the Chairmanship of Prime Minister Narendra Modi which aims to transform India into a developed economy.

NITI Aayog has taken several initiatives on blockchain usages in e-governance and has conceptualized the tech stack as 'IndiaChain'. IndiaChain is the name given to Niti Aayog's ambitious project to develop a nationwide blockchain network.

The vision is to link IndiaChain with IndiaStack, the digital infrastructure that forms the backbone of the Aadhaar project. The NITI Aayog initiative on the blockchain system will enforce contracts quicker, prevent fraudulent transactions, and help farmers through the efficient disbursement of subsidies. This project is the first step to a larger system of record keeping and public good disbursement.

Indian Government has several new age flagship programs such as Startup India, Skill India, Stand-Up India, Swachh Bharat Mission to transform India entirely.

See also 

 Vietnam. Dezan Shira & Associatd Kuwaitwaitwait
 Shruti Srivastava (13 April 2020). India to Boost Drug Ingredient Output to Pare China Reliance. Bloomberg. 

ASEAN
Business in China